The 2018 MLS Expansion Draft was a special draft for the Major League Soccer expansion team FC Cincinnati that was held on December 11, 2018. Lists of protected rosters and draft-eligible players were released by MLS on December 10, 2018.

Format
The rules for the 2018 MLS Expansion Draft as laid out by Major League Soccer.

 The five teams that had players selected by Los Angeles FC during the 2017 MLS Expansion Draft were exempt from the 2018 Expansion Draft: Seattle Sounders FC, Sporting Kansas City, San Jose Earthquakes, Columbus Crew SC, and Toronto FC.
 Existing teams were allowed to protect 11 players from their Senior, Supplemental, and Reserve Roster. Generation Adidas players and Homegrown Players on supplemental rosters were automatically protected and exempt from the expansion draft, though players who graduated from the Generation Adidas program to the senior roster at the end of the 2018 season were not exempt.
 If the player’s contract expired at the end of 2018, he was considered part of the club’s Senior Roster. (This includes players who have had their options declined.)
 Only one player might have been claimed from each club’s non-protected roster; that team was not allowed to lose any further players.
 The expansion draft lasted five rounds, totaling five players to be drafted.

Picks

Team-by-team breakdown
Here are all the players left non-protected on each MLS team's roster. FC Cincinnati's picks are marked with ✔.

Atlanta United FC
 Mikey Ambrose
 Jon Gallagher
 Jose Hernandez
 Mitch Hildebrandt
 Alec Kann
 Kevin Kratz
 Jeff Larentowicz
 Chris McCann
 Michael Parkhurst (FA)
 Oliver Shannon
 Brandon Vazquez
 Andrew Wheeler-Omiunu
 Romario Williams
 Sal Zizzo (FA)
Chicago Fire
 Jonathan Campbell
 Stefan Cleveland
 Elliot Collier
 Jorge Corrales
 Christian Dean
 Nicolas Del Grecco
 Alan Gordon (FA)
 Nicolas Hasler
 Daniel Johnson
 Patrick McLain
 Yura Movsisyan
 Richard Sánchez
 Luis Solignac
 Brandon Vincent
Colorado Rapids
 Giles Barnes
 Johan Blomberg
 Yannick Boli
 Caleb Calvert
 Edgar Castillo
 Kip Colvey
 Mike da Fonte
 Andrew Dykstra (FA)
 Shkëlzen Gashi
 Sam Hamilton
 Enzo Martinez
 Axel Sjoberg
 Danny Wilson
D.C. United
 Vytautas Andriuškevičius
 Frederic Brillant
 Nick DeLeon
 Kevin Ellis
 Jared Jeffrey
 Dane Kelly
 Taylor Kemp
 Darren Mattocks ✔
 Bruno Miranda
 Chris Odoi-Atsem
 Kofi Opare
 David Ousted
 Zoltan Stieber
 Travis Worra
FC Dallas
 Abel Aguilar
 Aníbal Chalá
 Cristian Colman
 Maynor Figueroa
 Moises Hernandez
 Roland Lamah ✔
 Marquinhos Pedroso
 Adonijah Reid
 Reto Ziegler
 Kyle Zobeck
Houston Dynamo
 Eric Alexander ✔
 Arturo Alvarez (FA)
 DaMarcus Beasley (FA)
 Eric Bird
 Leonardo (FA)
 Conor Donovan
 Boniek García
 Kevin Garcia
 Luis Gil
 Adolfo Machado
 Michael Nelson
 Dylan Remick
 Chris Seitz
 Philippe Senderos
 Mac Steeves
 Jared Watts
 Andrew Wenger
Los Angeles FC
 Steven Beitashour
 Tristan Blackmon
 Nicolás Czornomaz
 Danilo da Silva
 Benny Feilhaber (FA)
 Jordan Harvey (FA)
 Dejan Jakovic
 Luis Lopez
 Charlie Lyon
 Calum Mallace
 James Murphy
 Josh Perez
 Quillan Roberts
 Steeve Saint-Duc
 Marco Ureña
LA Galaxy
 Servando Carrasco
 Michael Ciani
 Ashley Cole
 Tomas Hilliard-Arce
 Baggio Husidic (FA)
 Perry Kitchen
 Ariel Lassiter
 João Pedro
 Chris Pontius
 Jorgen Skjelvik
 Brian Sylvestre
 Justin Vom Steeg
 Sheanon Williams (FA)
Minnesota United FC
 Fernando Bob
 Marc Burch (FA)
 Sam Cronin
 Luiz Fernando
 Alexi Gomez
 Ibson
 Alex Kapp
 Matt Lampson
 Carter Manley
 Eric Miller
 Wyatt Omsberg
 Bertrand Owundi
 Frantz Pangop
 Jerome Thiesson
 Johan Venegas
 Collen Warner (FA)
Montreal Impact
 Quincy Amarikwa (FA)
 Micheal Azira
 Rudy Camacho
 Zakaria Diallo
 Clement Diop
 Chris Duvall
 Rod Fanni
 Kyle Fisher
 Anthony Jackson-Hamel
 Matteo Mancosu
 Michael Petrasso
 Bacary Sagna
 Michael Salazar
New England Revolution
 Jalil Anibaba
 Cody Cropper
 Claude Dielna
 Guillermo Hauche
 Femi Hollinger-Janzen
 Brad Knighton
 Cristhian Machado
 Nicolas Samayoa
 Mark Segbers
 Gabriel Somi
 Chris Tierney (FA)
 Brian Wright
 Wilfried Zahibo
New York City FC
 Saad Abdul-Salaam
 Eloi Amagat
 Kwame Awuah
 Dan Bedoya
 Jo Inge Berget
 Jeff Caldwell
 Yangel Herrera
 Cedric Hountondji
 Sebastien Ibeagha
 Tommy McNamara
 Ebenezer Ofori
 Andre Rawls
 Brad Stuver
 David Villa
 Rodney Wallace (FA)
New York Red Bulls
 Anatole Abang
 Vincent Bezecourt
 Aurelien Collin (FA)
 Kyle Duncan
 Fidel Escobar
 Andreas Ivan
 Ethan Kutler
 Connor Lade
 Hassan Ndam ✔
 Tommy Redding
 Carlos Rivas
 Marc Rzatkowski
 Florian Valot
 Brian White
Orlando City SC
 R. J. Allen
 Joe Bendik
 Pierre da Silva
 Earl Edwards Jr.
 Cristian Higuita
 Will Johnson
 Sacha Kljestan
 Richie Laryea
 Stefano Pinho
 Dillon Powers
 Tony Rocha
 Lamine Sané
 Chris Schuler (FA)
 Jonathan Spector
 Scott Sutter
 Donny Toia
Philadelphia Union
 Warren Creavalle
 Borek Dockal
 Marcus Epps
 Fabinho
 Richie Marquez
 John McCarthy
 Jake McGuire
 Haris Medunjanin
 Kacper Przybylko
 Jay Simpson
 Josh Yaro
Portland Timbers
 Victor Arboleda
 Samuel Armenteros
 Dairon Asprilla
 Jack Barmby
 Julio Cascante
 Steve Clark
 Tomás Conechny
 Andrés Flores
 Jake Gleeson (FA)
 Modou Jadama
 Kendall McIntosh
 Roy Miller (FA)
 Lawrence Olum
 Alvas Powell
 Liam Ridgewell
 Bill Tuiloma
 Zarek Valentin
Real Salt Lake
 Jordan Allen 
 Shawn Barry 
 Tony Beltran (FA)
 Nick Besler 
 Adam Henley
 David Horst (FA)
 Alex Horwath
 Ricky Lopez-Espin 
 Luke Mulholland 
 Taylor Peay 
 Demar Phillips
 Andrew Putna 
 Luis Silva (FA)
 Connor Sparrow 
 Stephen Sunday
Vancouver Whitecaps FC
 José Aja
 Myer Bevan
 Marcel de Jong
 Roberto Dominguez
 Marvin Emnes
 Sean Franklin (FA)
 Ali Ghazal
 Efrain Juarez
 Kei Kamara ✔
 Stefan Marinovic
 Aaron Maund
 Jordon Mutch
 Brian Rowe
 Brek Shea (FA)

References

Major League Soccer Expansion Draft
2018 in American soccer
FC Cincinnati
MLS Expansion Draft